KNEX may refer to:

 KNEX (FM), a radio station (106.1 FM) licensed to Laredo, Texas, United States
 KYLX-LD, a low-power television station (channel 13) licensed to Laredo, Texas, United States, which used the call sign KNEX-LP from 2002 through 2015
 K'Nex, a construction toy